Thomas Hassall Anglican College is an independent Anglican co-educational early learning, primary, and secondary day school, located in Middleton Grange, a south-western suburb of Sydney, New South Wales, Australia. The College provides a religious and general education to approximately 1,700 students from early learning, through [[Prep
]] to Year 12.

Foundation

The College was founded in late 1999 by the Sydney Anglican Schools Corporation. Rapid growth in the area demanded the need for a new independent school, with nearest independent schools including Macarthur Anglican School, Freeman Catholic College and Good Samaritan Catholic College.

The school began operation on its current Middleton Grange campus in 2000. Initially the school operated Kindergarten to Year 6 classes, with an additional year being added each calendar year, until 2006 when both early learning and Year 12 began operation.

Today, Thomas Hassall Anglican College provides a high quality Christian education for more than 1,800 young people of the Western Sydney region, upholding both strong moral and religious values.

Headmasters
The following individuals have served as Headmaster of Thomas Hassall Anglican College:

The school crest and motto 
The school crest, worn by students on the front of the blazer, male students' shirts, and student sports uniforms is based on the cross schools motto: "A More Excellent Way".

School facilities 

Thomas Hassall Anglican College is located on a large campus in the suburb of Middleton Grange, in Sydney's South West. The school contains a 250-seat chapel, which can be used for performances and meetings. Two libraries are located on Campus, one in Primary and one in Secondary areas, both holding a large collection of resources, both digital and printed. An auditorium was opened in 2005, and along with new the athletic fields, basketball and tennis courts. The school also features a new administration block, science laboratories, a canteen (part of the Auditorium complex), and many classrooms including 7 computer rooms as well as a state of the art Apple Macintosh lab. WI-FI student access is available throughout the college. All of the college's facilities are also air conditioned, providing a stable environment for the student to learn.

A new gymnasium was opened on 22 August 2018, called the Rawdon Middleton VC Sports Complex, in honour of Rawdon Middleton , the namesake of the suburb.

See also 

 List of Anglican schools in New South Wales
 Anglican education in Australia

References

2000 establishments in Australia
Educational institutions established in 2000
Anglican primary schools in Sydney
Anglican secondary schools in Sydney
City of Liverpool (New South Wales)